St Ann's Church, South Tottenham, is an Evangelical Anglican church in the St Ann's neighbourhood in South Tottenham, London, UK, a part of the Church of England. 
The church currently holds one Sunday service at 10.30am.

History
The church was founded in 1860 and dedicated in 1861. The architect of the building was Thomas Talbot Bury. Its construction was funded by Fowler Newsam, a business man who lived nearby, Fowler Newsam Hall, opposite the church on Avenue Road, is named after him.

References

South Tottenham
Diocese of London
Grade II* listed buildings in the London Borough of Haringey